Yvon Buissereth was a Haitian politician. He was assassinated in 2022 amidst unrest in the country. A former senator, he became a social housing official. He was found dead along with his nephew by their burned vehicle. Officials blamed gang violence. He became a senator in 2006. He represented Haiti's South Department. He and his nephew were killed in Laboule 12, a commune in Pétion-Ville. Politician Eric-Jean Baptiste was killed a couple of months later in the same area.

References

Year of birth missing
20th-century births
2022 deaths
21st-century Haitian politicians
Members of the Senate (Haiti)
Assassinated Haitian politicians
Deaths by firearm in Haiti
People murdered in Haiti